James Stack may refer to:

 James S. Stack (1852–1920), American judge, hotel owner, and politician
 James Stack (missionary) (1801–1883), Wesleyan Methodist missionary in New Zealand
 James West Stack (1835–1919), New Zealand missionary, clergyman, writer and interpreter